Johan Donar and Ola Jonsson were the defending champions, but lost in the first round to Sergio Casal and Emilio Sánchez.

Casal and Sánchez won the title by defeating Juan Garat and Jorge Lozano 6–3, 6–3 in the final.

Seeds

Draw

Draw

References

External links
 Official results archive (ATP)
 Official results archive (ITF)

Campionati Internazionali di Sicilia
1993 ATP Tour
Camp